Rudolf Dobrijević (27 January 1906 – 29 May 1991) was a Croatian footballer.

Club career
Born in Pula on 27 January 1906, back then part of Austro-Hungary, he was working as a chauffeur in the Spanish consulate in Fiume (Rijeka), and he started playing there for a local club AS Gloria while his brother played for Orijent.  In 1929 he moved to Belgrade and joined SK Jugoslavija playing with them in the Yugoslav First League.  He played mainly as right midfielder or winger.  However, after two seasons he suffered a major injury and never more returned to professional football.

International career
He played one match for the Yugoslav national team. It was played against Bulgaria (2-2) on June 15, 1930, and it was the last match Yugoslavia played in their preparations for the 1930 FIFA World Cup.

Personal life
He spent his last years of life in Rijeka and died on 29 May 1991.

References

External links
 

1906 births
1991 deaths
Sportspeople from Pula
Association football midfielders
Yugoslav footballers
Yugoslavia international footballers
SK Jugoslavija players
Yugoslav First League players